Linnville is an unincorporated community in Licking County, in the U.S. state of Ohio.

History
Linnville had its start when the National Road was extended to that point. The community was laid out in 1829. Linnville was named Adam Linn, a pioneer merchant. A post office was established at Linnville in 1833, and remained in operation until 1903.

References

Unincorporated communities in Licking County, Ohio
1829 establishments in Ohio
Populated places established in 1829
Unincorporated communities in Ohio